"Glycerine" is a song by English band Bush. It was released on 14 November 1995 as the fourth single from their debut album, Sixteen Stone.

Composition
Gavin Rossdale wrote the song about his then-girlfriend, Suze DeMarchi as stated in an interview with Howard Stern. He wrote it in his London flat, feeling that there was an ancient, mystical element to the song as it was coming together. He told Entertainment Weekly in 2017 that "I was like a conduit. Something about it was bigger than anything we were doing."

The song is in the key of F major. The chord progression is F maj – C maj – D min – B maj throughout the verse with various ornamental embellishments diatonic to the key of F major, including the bridge which cycles between the I (F major), V (C major), IV (B major), and V chord in F Major. The refrain towards the end hangs on the vi (D minor) – IV (B major) before returning to the recurring progression for the last verse.

The single includes a previously unreleased B-side, "Solomon's Bones", which was recorded on 7 November 1995 at River Studios, London and engineered by Joel Monger.

Music video
The music video for "Glycerine" was shot in a very short time period when the band was on tour in the United States. The video was shot so quickly because the band's visas had expired. Though simple and unadorned, the video was highly acclaimed and won several awards, including the MTV Video Music Award - Viewer's Choice as well nominated for Best Alternative Video at the 1996 MTV Video Music Awards. The music video was directed by Kevin Kerslake and shot in Atlanta, Georgia on 2 October 1995.

Track listing
 "Glycerine"
 "Solomon's Bones"
 "Alien" [LP Version]

Commercial performance
Following the album's third single, "Comedown", "Glycerine" shared equal success. Like "Comedown", it reached number one on the Modern Rock Tracks chart for two weeks, in December 1995. It is also the band's biggest pop hit to date, peaking at number 28 on the Billboard Hot 100 on 24 February 1996. The song won the Viewer's Choice Award at the 1996 MTV Music Video Awards. The song was voted number 5 on the Australian annual music poll Triple J Hottest 100 in 1996.

Chart positions

Weekly charts

Year-end charts

Certifications

Live version

Bush performed a new version of "Glycerine" at KROQ Almost Acoustic Christmas on 8 December 2012, which featured a surprise appearance from American singer and songwriter, and Gavin Rossdale's then-wife Gwen Stefani. The single was never released on an album, as both Stefani and Bush were not working on any new material.

References

External links

1994 songs
1995 singles
2012 singles
Bush (British band) songs
British alternative rock songs
Gwen Stefani songs
Atlantic Records singles
Interscope Records singles
Trauma Records singles
Music videos directed by Kevin Kerslake
1990s ballads
Rock ballads
Song recordings produced by Alan Winstanley
Song recordings produced by Clive Langer
Songs written by Gavin Rossdale